Anthony Peter Dunne (24 July 19418 June 2020) was an Irish footballer who played as a left-back. Born in Dublin, he began his career with youth side Stella Maris before signing for Drumcondra-based Shelbourne, with whom he won the FAI Cup in his second year in the senior team in 1960. That year, he moved to England to play for Manchester United, for whom he made more than 500 appearances in 13 years, winning the First Division in 1965 and 1967, the FA Cup in 1963 and the European Cup in 1968. After being released in 1973, he signed for Bolton Wanderers, making another almost 200 appearances in six years, before playing a single season with the Detroit Express in the North American Soccer League in 1979. Dunne won 33 caps for the Republic of Ireland between 1962 and 1975, and was named Irish Footballer of the Year in 1969. After retiring, he had a brief spell as manager of Norwegian club Steinkjer FK in 1982–83.

Club career

Early career
Born in Dublin on 24 July 1941, Dunne played for Stella Maris as a schoolboy and Shelbourne from 1958 to 1960. Having helped Shelbourne win the FAI Youth Cup in 1959, he won the FAI Cup with them the following year, beating Cork Hibernians 2–0 in the final.

Manchester United
A week after the final, on 26 April 1960, he was signed by Manchester United for £5,000 as cover for Noel Cantwell and Shay Brennan. His debut for United came against Burnley on 15 October 1960, playing at left-back alongside Maurice Setters. He helped Manchester United win the FA Cup in 1963, and the First Division title 1965 and 1967. His highest honour came as part of the side that won the 1968 European Cup, beating Benfica 4–1 in the final. This was despite having ruptured his Achilles tendon in the quarter-final of the competition against Gornik Zabrze.

He made 535 appearances for Manchester United, behind only Bobby Charlton and Bill Foulkes at the time of his departure in 1973.

Bolton Wanderers
Dunne was released by Manchester United following the 1972–73 season, and signed for newly promoted Second Division side Bolton Wanderers in August 1973, though he returned to Manchester United for a testimonial match two months later. In six years with Bolton, he made almost 200 appearances and helped them win the Second Division in 1977–78.

Detroit Express
He joined Detroit Express in the North American Soccer League (NASL) in 1979.

International career
He made his full international debut in the 3–2 home defeat by Austria on 8 April 1962. Over 13 years, he earned 33 caps, appearing in both full-back positions and at centre-half. He captained his country on four occasions. He was named Irish Footballer of the Year in 1969.

Management career
After retiring from professional football, Dunne returned to Bolton as an assistant manager from 1979 to 1981; he then replaced his former Manchester United teammate Bill Foulkes as manager of Norwegian club Steinkjer FK in 1982–1983.

Personal life
Dunne lived in Sale and ran a driving range in Altrincham.

He died on 8 June 2020, aged 78.

Honours

Shelbourne
FAI Cup: 1959–60

Manchester United
Football League First Division: 1964–65, 1966–67
FA Cup: 1962–63
European Cup: 1967–68
FA Charity Shield: 1965, 1967

Bolton Wanderers
Football League Second Division: 1977–78

References

Footnotes

Bibliography

External links
Irish football greats @ fai.ie

1941 births
2020 deaths
Republic of Ireland association footballers
Republic of Ireland expatriate association footballers
Republic of Ireland international footballers
Shelbourne F.C. players
Manchester United F.C. players
Bolton Wanderers F.C. players
Bolton Wanderers F.C. non-playing staff
North American Soccer League (1968–1984) players
Detroit Express players
Expatriate footballers in England
Expatriate soccer players in the United States
Association footballers from Dublin (city)
League of Ireland players
Stella Maris F.C. players
Association football defenders
UEFA Champions League winning players
Republic of Ireland expatriate football managers
Irish expatriates in Norway
Republic of Ireland football managers
Steinkjer FK managers
Expatriate football managers in Norway
FA Cup Final players